The Peruvian tree rat (Makalata rhipidura) is a species of rodent in the family Echimyidae. It is found in northeastern Peru and adjacent Ecuador, where it is found in the Amazon rainforest. It is nocturnal and arboreal.

References

Makalata
Mammals of Peru
Mammals described in 1928
Taxa named by Oldfield Thomas
Taxonomy articles created by Polbot
Taxobox binomials not recognized by IUCN